SouthGang was a Los Angeles-based rock band composed of lead vocalist Jesse Harte, guitarist Butch Walker, bassist Jayce Fincher, and drummer Mitch "Slug" McLee, active in the late 1980s and early 1990s.  The band's original name was Byte the Bullet, which was changed to SouthGang before they released their first album, Tainted Angel. They had a similar style to many of the other "hair bands" of the era. The band is best remembered for their 1991 single "Tainted Angel," which received some MTV airplay, especially during Headbangers Ball.

Tainted Angel was produced by Howard Benson and Desmond Child.

After the band's breakup in the mid-1990s, Butch Walker, Jayce Fincher, and Mitch McLee went on to form power pop band Marvelous 3, scoring a minor hit with "Freak of the Week" in 1998.

More recently, Butch Walker has had a successful solo music career, as well as written and produced hits for many of today's pop and rock artists such as Fall Out Boy, Panic! at the Disco & Bowling for Soup.

Jesse Harte is currently residing in the Atlanta Area, working in the cell phone industry. He released an EP in 2012 with a project called Red Bloody Hearts.

Mitch McLee is still playing drums in Atlanta, Georgia.

Jayce Fincher is married to Christina Lloree-Fincher with a couple of children.  He is working at a church in Atlanta as the musical production "go to" person.  He also works with the middle school ministry.

Band members 
 Jesse Harte - vocals
 Butch Walker - guitars, talkbox, backing vocals
 Jayce Fincher - bass guitar, backing vocals
 Mitch "Slug" McLee - drums, percussion

Discography

Studio albums 
 Tainted Angel - 1991
 Group Therapy - 1992

Live album 
 SouthGang: Live in Heaven - bootleg live album from 5/29/1991

Singles 
 "Love Ain't Enough" from Tainted Angel
 "Love For Sale" from Tainted Angel
 "Tainted Angel" from Tainted Angel
 "Fire In Your Body" from Group Therapy
 "Tug of War" from Group Therapy

References

External links 
 http://www.butchwalker.com

Glam metal musical groups from California
Hard rock musical groups from California
Heavy metal musical groups from California
Musical groups from Los Angeles